The 2015 AFC Cup was the 12th edition of the AFC Cup, Asia's secondary club football tournament organized by the Asian Football Confederation (AFC).

Johor Darul Ta'zim won the tournament after defeating Istiklol in the final.

Al-Qadsia were the defending champions, but they were eliminated in the semi-finals after the Kuwait Football Association was suspended by FIFA.

Association team allocation
The AFC Competitions Committee proposed a revamp of the AFC club competitions on 25 January 2014, which was ratified by the AFC Executive Committee on 16 April 2014. The member associations are ranked based on their national team's and clubs' performance over the last four years in AFC competitions, with the allocation of slots for the 2015 and 2016 editions of the AFC club competitions determined by the 2014 rankings:
The top 24 member associations (MAs) as per the AFC rankings which do not receive direct slots in the AFC Champions League are eligible to participate in the AFC Cup group stage (including losers of the AFC Champions League qualifying play-off).
The MAs ranked 25 to 32 are eligible to participate in the AFC Cup group stage, and the associations ranked 33 to 47 are eligible to participate in the AFC Cup qualifying play-off (including those of "emerging countries" which participated in the AFC President's Cup, whose last edition was in 2014).

The AFC Competitions Committee decided on the participation of member associations in the 2015 and 2016 editions of the AFC Cup on 28 November 2014.

Notes

Teams
The following 41 teams from 23 associations entered the competition.

Teams in italics played in the 2015 AFC Champions League qualifying play-off, but failed to advance to the AFC Champions League group stage (had they advanced to the AFC Champions League group stage, they would have been replaced by another team from the same association).

Notes

Schedule
The schedule of the competition was as follows (all draws were held in Kuala Lumpur, Malaysia).

Qualifying play-off

The bracket for the qualifying play-off, which consisted of two rounds (preliminary round and play-off round), was determined by the AFC based on the association ranking of each team. Each tie was played as a single match, with the team from the higher-ranked association hosting the match. Extra time and penalty shoot-out were used to decide the winner if necessary. The winners of each tie in the play-off round advanced to the group stage to join the 27 automatic qualifiers.

Preliminary round

Notes

Play-off round

Group stage

The draw for the group stage was held on 11 December 2014. The 32 teams were drawn into eight groups of four. Teams from the same association could not be drawn into the same group. Each group was played on a home-and-away round-robin basis. The winners and runners-up of each group advanced to the round of 16.

Tiebreakers
The teams were ranked according to points (3 points for a win, 1 point for a draw, 0 points for a loss). If tied on points, tiebreakers would be applied in the following order:
Greater number of points obtained in the group matches between the teams concerned;
Goal difference resulting from the group matches between the teams concerned;
Greater number of goals scored in the group matches between the teams concerned;
Greater number of away goals scored in the group matches between the teams concerned;
If, after applying criteria 1 to 4, teams still have an equal ranking, criteria 1 to 4 are reapplied exclusively to the matches between the teams in question to determine their final rankings. If this procedure does not lead to a decision, criteria 6 to 10 apply;
Goal difference in all the group matches;
Greater number of goals scored in all the group matches;
Penalty shoot-out if only two teams are involved and they are both on the field of play;
Fewer score calculated according to the number of yellow and red cards received in the group matches (1 point for a single yellow card, 3 points for a red card as a consequence of two yellow cards, 3 points for a direct red card, 4 points for a yellow card followed by a direct red card);
Team who belongs to the member association with the higher AFC ranking.

Group A

Group B

Group C

Group D

Group E

Group F

Group G

Group H

Knockout stage

In the knockout stage, the 16 teams played a single-elimination tournament. In the quarter-finals and semi-finals, each tie was played on a home-and-away two-legged basis, while in the round of 16 and final, each tie was played as a single match. The away goals rule (for two-legged ties), extra time (away goals would not apply in extra time) and penalty shoot-out were used to decide the winner if necessary.

Bracket

Round of 16
In the round of 16, the winners of one group played the runners-up of another group in the same zone, with the group winners hosting the match.

Notes

Quarter-finals
The draw for the quarter-finals was held on 18 June 2015. Teams from different zones could be drawn into the same tie, and there was no seeding or country protection, so teams from the same association could be drawn into the same tie.

Semi-finals
In the semi-finals, the matchups were determined by the quarter-final draw.

Notes

Final

In the final, the host team was determined by a draw, held after the quarter-final draw.

Awards

Top scorers

See also
2015 AFC Champions League

References

External links
AFC Cup, the-AFC.com

 
2
2015